Edvin is a form of Edwin and may refer to:

Edvin Alten (1876–1967), Norwegian judge
Edvin Biuković (1969–1999), Croatian comics artist
Edvin Hagberg (1875–1947), Swedish sailor and Olympic competitor
Edvin Hevonkoski (1923–2009), Finnish sculptor and contemporary artist
Edvin Kallstenius (1881–1967), Swedish composer and arranger
Edvin Karlsson, Swedish politician
Edvin Laine (1905–1989), Finnish film director
Edvin Landsem (1925–2004), Norwegian cross country skier who competed in the 1950s
Edvin Liveric (born 1970), Croatian actor
Edvin Kanka Ćudić (born 1988), Bosnian human rights activist
Edvin Marton (born 1974), Hungarian composer and violinist
Edvin Mattiasson (1890–1975), Swedish wrestler
Edvin Ozolin (born 1939), Soviet-Russian sprinter
Edvin Paulsen (1889–1963), Norwegian gymnast
Edvin Ryding (born 2003), Swedish actor
Edvin Sugarev (born 1953), Bulgarian politician
Edvin Tiemroth (1915–1984), Danish actor and film director
Edvin Wide (1896–1996), Swedish long-distance runner

See also
Edvīns, the Latvian cognate of Edvin

Croatian masculine given names
Danish masculine given names
Norwegian masculine given names
Swedish masculine given names